I'll Follow You or I Will Follow You may refer to:

Songs
"I'll Follow You" (Shinedown song), 2013
"I'll Follow You (Up to Our Cloud), by George Jones, 1971
"I Will Follow You", by Schiller, 2010
"I'll Follow You", written by Fred Ahlert and Roy Turk
"I'll Follow You", by Jim Reeves, 1955
"I'll Follow You", by Martha and the Vandellas from Watchout!, 1966
"I'll Follow You", by REO Speedwagon from Good Trouble, 1982
"I Will Follow You", by Night Ranger from 7 Wishes, 1985
"I Will Follow You", by Modern Talking from Back for Good, 1998
"I Will Follow You", by Blue October from  This Is What I Live For, 2020

Albums
I'll Follow You, by Oakley Hall, 2007